Elmer Clay Brown (December 16, 1888 - July 1973) was a professional baseball third baseman in the Negro leagues. He played with the Indianapolis ABCs in 1921.

References

External links
 and Seamheads

Indianapolis ABCs players
1888 births
1973 deaths
Baseball third basemen
Baseball players from Illinois
20th-century African-American people
Sportspeople from Champaign, Illinois